Samuel Montefiore Waxman (October 23, 1885 — June 6, 1980) was Professor of Romance languages at Boston University from 1910 to 1955, and chair of the department from 1937 to 1955. He continued to lecture at the University until 1970. He was honored with a festschrift in 1969.

His bequest established a fund in 1980 for the purchase of rare books relating to the history of ideas. The Samuel M. Waxman Collection, which also includes extensive holdings in the fields of Spanish, Portuguese, Italian and French literature and history, forms a part of the Howard Gotlieb Archival Research Center at Boston University.

He was married to painter Frances Burwell Sheafer, who died in 1938, and then to sculptor Bashka Paeff.

Works

References

External links
 
 
 

20th-century scholars
1885 births
1980 deaths
Boston University faculty